Joseph Mukasa Balikuddembe (1860 – 15 November 1885) was a Ugandan Catholic martyr and the majordomo at the court of Mwanga II of Buganda, recognized as a saint by the Catholic Church.

The Missionaries of Our Lady of Africa came to Uganda in 1879. Balikuddembe was enrolled as a catechumen in the following year and along with Andrew Kaggwa, was baptized by Père Simon Lourdel M.Afr. (Fr. Mapera) on 30 April 1882. Balikuddembe took the baptismal name of "Joseph".

From November 1882 to July 1885 the Catholic missionaries, for reasons of security, abandoned the Ugandan mission and re-located temporarily to the southern end of Lake Victoria. In the absence of the missionaries, Balikuddembe became leader of the Christians.

King Mutesa was succeeded by his eighteen-year-old son, Danieri Mwanga II. Early in his reign, the new king began to crack down on Christian missionaries and converts in his country, and executed the British Anglican bishop James Hannington and his companions on October 29, 1885, ignoring Balikuddembe's pleas to spare the bishop. Godfrey Muwonge attributes this to the influence of Mwanga's  Katikkiro (Prime Minister) Mukasa, who sought to control the spread of Christianity in Buganda by eliminating its teachers.

Another reason that Mwanga killed Balikuddembe was because he spoke out against Mwanga's homosexual practices. As catechumens, the recent converts could no longer engage in activities which they saw as unchristian. Mwanga saw this as insubordination.

As Mwanga's senior adviser, Balikuddembe spoke against the killing of the bishop. Mwanga viewed this a disrespectful. After a night-long interview the king condemned Balikuddembe to death. Muwonge says that the Katikkiro Musaka saw to it that the order was carried out before the king could change his mind. On 15 November 1885 Balikuddembe was taken to a place near the Nakivubo river where he was beheaded and his body thrown onto a pile of burning firewood. His duties were assumed by the young catechist Charles Lwanga.

Veneration 
Balikuddembe is remembered as first of the Martyrs of Uganda and is the patron of politicians and chiefs.

St. Joseph Mukasa Balikuddembe Parish is located in Kisoga.

References

External links

 Joseph Mukasa bio
The Uganda Martyrs from the August 2008 issue of The Word Among Us magazine
Joseph Mukasa's profile from UgandaMartyrsShrine.org

Joseph Mukasa Balikuddembe's profile from Dictionary of African Christian Biography

1860 births
1885 deaths
19th-century Christian saints
19th-century executions by Uganda
19th-century Roman Catholic martyrs
Roman Catholic missionaries in Uganda
Converts to Roman Catholicism from pagan religions
Executed Ugandan people
People executed by Buganda
Christian martyrs executed by decapitation
Ugandan Roman Catholic missionaries
Ugandan Roman Catholic saints
People executed by Uganda by decapitation